Richard Park (Korean name: Bak Yong-Su, Hangul: 박용수; born May 27, 1976) is a South Korean-born American former professional ice hockey forward who played 14 National Hockey League (NHL) seasons with six different teams. He was formerly a player development coach for the Minnesota Wild organization. Park is currently the assistant coach of the South Korea men's national ice hockey team under head coach Jim Paek.

Playing career
Born in Seoul, South Korea, Park moved to Rancho Palos Verdes, California, with his family at age three. As a youth, he played in the 1989 Quebec International Pee-Wee Hockey Tournament with the Los Angeles Kings minor ice hockey team.  At age 13, he moved to Ontario and played minor hockey in the Greater Toronto Hockey League (GTHL), and played in the 1990 Quebec International Pee-Wee Hockey Tournament with the Toronto Young Nationals. Park and his brother Horton attended De La Salle College and captained their hockey team. He eventually worked his way up to the Belleville Bulls of the Ontario Hockey League (OHL) and played for Belleville from 1992–93 to 1995–96.

Following his second OHL season, he was drafted 50th overall by the Pittsburgh Penguins during the 1994 NHL Entry Draft. He made his NHL debut when he played one regular season game and three Stanley Cup playoff games for Pittsburgh during the 1994–95 season. He became only the second Korean-born person to play in the NHL after Jim Paek. Coincidentally, both of them were drafted by the Penguins. Park played most of the 1995–96 NHL season, appearing in 56 games. He spent the next few years moving between the Anaheim Ducks, Philadelphia Flyers and various International Hockey League (IHL) and American Hockey League (AHL) teams. He played again in the NHL during the 2001–02 season after signing with the  Minnesota Wild.

Park spent three seasons in Minnesota, from 2001–02 to 2003–04, where over the course of several seasons, he achieved career-highs in games played (81), goals scored (14), assists earned (15) and points totalled (25). During the Wild's run in the 2003 Stanley Cup playoffs, Park scored the winning goal in overtime in Game 6 of the Western Conference Quarterfinals against the Colorado Avalanche.

During the 2004–05 NHL lockout, Park played in Europe as a member of the United States national men's ice hockey team, which won the 2004 Deutschland Cup. He would go on to sign short term contracts in Sweden and Switzerland with the Malmö Redhawks and SCL Tigers respectively. On August 8, 2005, prior to the 2005–06 season, Park signed a one-year, US$750,000 contract with the Vancouver Canucks. At the end of his contract, he signed a two-year contract with the New York Islanders.

On March 29, 2008, Park was named the recipient of the Bob Nystrom Award, awarded annually to the Islander "who best exemplifies leadership, hustle and dedication". Park usually played in a penalty killing role and is considered an above-average skater. He also served as the Islanders alternate captain in the 2008–09 season. During his time with the Islanders, he scored two shorthanded goals on 5-on-3's, a very rare feat in the NHL.

On September 9, 2010, Park left the NHL after 684 career games, signing a three-year contract with Genève-Servette HC of the National League A (NLA), marking his return to Switzerland after a brief stint during the 2004–05 lockout.

On September 8, 2011, Park made a return to the NHL, signing a one-year, two-way contract for a second stint with the Pittsburgh Penguins.

In August 2012, Park signed a two-year contract to return to the NLA with HC Ambrì-Piotta, where he finished his playing career.

Coaching career 
Park served as assistant coach of the South Korea men's national ice hockey team behind head coach Jim Paek until 2018.

Career statistics

Regular season and playoffs

International

Awards
OHL All-Rookie Team – 1993
AHL Second All-Star Team – 1999

Transactions
March 18, 1997 – Traded to Anaheim by Pittsburgh for Roman Oksiuta.
August 24, 1998 – Signed as a free agent by Philadelphia.
September 22, 1999 – Signed as a free agent by Utah (IHL).
June 6, 2000 – Signed as a free agent by Minnesota.
November 8, 2004 – Signed as a free agent by Malmo (Sweden).
January 4, 2005 – Signed as a free agent by Langnau (Swiss).
August 8, 2005 – Signed as a free agent by Vancouver.
October 2, 2006 – Signed as a free agent by NY Islanders.
September 9, 2010 – Signed as a free agent by Geneve (Swiss).
September 8, 2011 – Signed as a free agent by Pittsburgh.
August 7, 2012 – Signed as a free agent by Ambri-Piotta (Swiss).
October 14, 2014 – Retired.

References

External links

1976 births
American expatriate sportspeople in Italy
American expatriate sportspeople in Switzerland
American expatriate ice hockey players in Sweden
American men's ice hockey right wingers
American sportspeople of Korean descent
Belleville Bulls players
Cincinnati Mighty Ducks players
Cleveland Lumberjacks players
Genève-Servette HC players
HC Ambrì-Piotta players
Houston Aeros (1994–2013) players
Ice hockey people from Seoul
Living people
Malmö Redhawks players
Mighty Ducks of Anaheim players
Minnesota Wild coaches
Minnesota Wild players
Minnesota Wild scouts
New York Islanders players
Philadelphia Flyers players
Philadelphia Phantoms players
Pittsburgh Penguins draft picks
Pittsburgh Penguins players
SCL Tigers players
South Korea men's national ice hockey team coaches
South Korean emigrants to the United States
South Korean ice hockey coaches
Ice hockey players from California
Utah Grizzlies (IHL) players
Vancouver Canucks players
American emigrants to Canada